Isovaleryl-coenzyme A, also known as isovaleryl-CoA, is an intermediate in the metabolism of branched-chain amino acids.

Leucine metabolism

See also
 Isovaleryl coenzyme A dehydrogenase

References

Thioesters of coenzyme A